John Martin (November 12, 1833September 3, 1913) was an American lawyer and politician from Hartsville, Tennessee. He represented Kansas in the United States Senate from 1893 until 1895.

Martin was born near Hartsville, Trousdale County, Tennessee on November 12, 1833. He attended the common schools and clerked in stores and the post office, before moving to Tecumseh, Shawnee County, Kansas in 1855. He was elected assistant clerk of the first house of representatives in the Territory in 1855; county clerk and register of deeds 1855-1857; studied law; admitted to the bar in 1856 and commenced practice in Tecumseh; justice of the peace 1857; county attorney of Shawnee County 1858-1860; postmaster of Tecumseh 1858-1859; deputy United States attorney 1859-1861; reporter of the State supreme court 1860; moved to Topeka and practiced law in 1861; member, State house of representatives 1871-1875; unsuccessful Democratic candidate for governor in 1876 and for the United States Senate in 1877; district judge 1883-1885; unsuccessful candidate for election to the Fiftieth Congress; unsuccessful candidate for governor in 1888; elected as a Democrat to the United States Senate on January 25, 1893, to fill the remainder of the term left vacant by the death of Preston B. Plumb; served from March 4, 1893, to March 3, 1895; chairman, Committee on Railroads (Fifty-third Congress); clerk of the Supreme Court of Kansas 1897-1899.

Martin died in Topeka, Kansas on September 3, 1913, and was interred in Topeka Cemetery.

References

External links
 
 

1833 births
1913 deaths
Kansas state court judges
Democratic Party members of the Kansas House of Representatives
Democratic Party United States senators from Kansas
People from Hartsville, Tennessee
People from Shawnee County, Kansas
Politicians from Topeka, Kansas
19th-century American judges
People buried in Topeka Cemetery